Ampere Way is a tram stop in the London Borough of Croydon, serving the Purley Way commercial area. Tramlink trams serve the stop, which is located opposite IKEA Croydon.

When the stop opened, it was named "Ampere Way" in reference to the nearby former Croydon Power Station.  The two chimneys from the old power station still exist in the grounds of the IKEA store.

The station was renamed IKEA Ampere Way under a sponsorship deal on 18 October 2006, in order to promote the stop's location near IKEA's Croydon store. By March 2008, the station had reverted to its former name.

The tramstop is served by tram services between Elmers End/Beckenham Junction and Wimbledon.

Connections
London Buses route 455 serves the tram stop.

References 

Tramlink stops in the London Borough of Croydon
Railway stations in Great Britain opened in 2000